Nakhon Si Thammarat province (often shortened to Nakhon, Nakhon Si, Khon, internationally known as Mueang Khon is one of the southern provinces (changwat) of Thailand, on the western shore of the Gulf of Thailand. Neighboring provinces are (from south clockwise) Songkhla, Phatthalung, Trang, Krabi and Surat Thani.

The name of the province derives from its Pali–Sanskrit name Nagara Sri Dhammaraja ('City of the Sacred Dharma King'), which in Thai pronunciation becomes "Nakhon Si Thammarat".

, the population of the province was 1,560,433 persons.

The Nakhon Si Thammarat People's also known as Kon Khon

Geography
The province is on the Gulf of Thailand on the east side of the Malay Peninsula. The terrain is mostly rugged hilly forest.

National parks
There area a total of six national parks, five ofwhich, along with fifteen other national parks, make up region 5 (Nakhon Si Thammarat) and Khao Pu–Khao Ya in region 6 (Songkhla) of Thailand's protected areas.
 Khao Pu–Khao Ya National Park, 
 Khao Luang National Park, 
 Khao Nan National Park, 
 Hat Khanom–Mu Ko Thale Tai National Park, 
 Namtok Yong National Park, 
 Namtok Si Khit National Park,

History

 
Nakhon Si Thammarat is one of the oldest cities in Thailand with a rich history. The earliest settlement in the vicinity of the city was Tha Rua, about ten kilometers south of the modern city, where ceramics from the Song dynasty were found dated to the twelfth century.
In ancient times, Nakhon Si Thammarat was under the rule of the Srivijaya, the king of Srivijaya had established a foothold on the Malay Peninsula at Ligor" by 775, where he "built various edifices, including a sanctuary dedicated to the Buddha and to the Bodhisattvas Padmapani and Vajrapani. 

The Chronicles of Nakhon Si Thammarat, composed in the seventeenth century, attributed the foundation of current city of Nakhon Si Thammarat to King Sri Thammasok in the thirteenth century. An inscription found at Chaiya stated that King Sri Thammasok ruled Tambralinga in 1231. King Sri Thammasok constructed Wat Phra Mahathat and introduced Singhalese Theravada Buddhism. The Nakhon Si Thammarat Kingdom held authorities over "twelve cities" that extended from Chumphon to the north and Pahang to the south. The Ramkamhaeng Stele of Sukhothai first mentioned "Nakhon Si Thammarat" in 1292, which means "The City of King Sri Thammasok" or "The City of the Virtuous king". The Nakhon Si Thammarat kingdom ended and the city perished in the fourteenth century. The ruler of Phetchaburi known as Phra Phanom Thale sent his son Phra Phanom Wang to re-establish the city and rule. Nakhon Si Thammarat then came under the influence of Central Siamese Kingdom of Ayutthaya under the mandala system.

Ayutthaya Period
Nakhon Si Thammarat was further incorporated into Ayutthaya, who appointed governors to the city, through centralization under King Trailokanat in the fifteenth century. Nakhon Si Thammarat served as the main seat of Siamese authority over Southern Thailand and the Malay Peninsula, becoming Muang Ek or first-level city. Yamada Nagamasa, the Japanese adventurer, was appointed as the governor of Nakhon Si Thammarat in 1629.

After the Siamese revolution of 1688, the governor of Nakhon Si Thammarat rebelled against the new King Phetracha. King Phetracha sent troops to put down rebels in Nakhon Si Thammarat in 1692.

Thonburi Period
After the Fall of Ayutthaya in 1767, Phra Palat Nu the vice-governor of Nakhon Si Thammarat established himself as the local warlord and ruler over Southern Thailand. King Taksin of Thonburi marched south to subjugate Phra Palat Nu or Chao Phraya Nakhon Nu in 1769. Chao Phraya Nakhon Nu was taken to Thonburi but King Taksin re-installed Nakhon Nu as a tributary ruler of Nakhon Si Thammarat in 1776.

Rattanakosin Period
After Chaophraya Nakhon (Noi), his son and grandson became respective governors of Nakhon Si Thammarat. During the reforms of King Chulalongkorn, the traditional governorship of Nakhon Si Thammarat was abolished and the city was incorporated into the Monthon Nakhon Si Thammarat in 1896. 

When the monthon system was abolished in 1932, Nakhon Si Thammarat then became a province until the present.

Environment
Forested peat swamp forests cover more than 9,900 hectares on the borders of Nakhon Si Thammarat, Phatthalung, and Songkhla provinces. About 800 hectares of the peat swamp were destroyed by 88 fires in the first half of 2019. The Royal Forest Department says that most of the fires in the Khuan Khreng peat swamp forest were man-made. Criminals clear the forest for the illegal expansion of rubber and oil palm plantations. Honey collectors and fishermen were also complicit as they burn grass to catch fish or to collect wild honey. Khuan Khreng peat swamp was hit by drought in what is normally the rainy season making it susceptible to arson. The forest is surrounded by oil palm plantations and surface water in the forest has been drained out to feed the plantations.

The province is home to Khao Luang National Park and Hat Khanom–Mu Ko Thale Tai National Park.

Economy
Tourism has become a first-tier tourist province, as defined by the central government, joining 22 other first-tier provinces. In 2019, it is projected to receive four million tourists—80% of them domestic—largely attracted by religious sites. They contributed more than 11 billion baht to the provincial economy. The Airports Department plans to expand Nakhon Si Thammarat airport runways and terminal by 2022 to deal with an anticipated increase in international flights to support foreign visitor arrivals. The province has 320 hotels with 8,800 rooms, up from 310 hotels and 7,000 rooms in 2018.

Symbols
The provincial seal shows the Phra Baromathat chedi of Wat Phra Mahathat Voramahavihan, one of the most important historical sites in southern Thailand. According to the city chronicle it was already built in 311, but archaeology dates it to the 13th century. The chedi was built by the ruler of Malay Buddha Kingdom of Tambralinga, named Chandrabhanu Sridhamaraja of The Patama Vamsa (Lotus Dynasty). The chedi is surrounded by the animals of the Chinese zodiac in the seal. The twelve animals represent the twelve Naksat cities or city-states which were tributary to the Nakhon Si Thammarat kingdom: the Rat of Saiburi; the Ox of Pattani; the Tiger of Kelantan; the Rabbit of Pahang (actually a city in Pahang which is said to be submerged by a lake now); the Dragon of Kedah; the Snake of Phatthalung; the Horse of Trang; the Goat of Chumphon; the Monkey of Bantaysamer (might be Chaiya, or a town in Krabi province); the Rooster of Sa-ulau (unidentified city, might be Songkhla, Kanchanadit or Pla Tha); the Dog of Takua Pa and a Pig of Kraburi.

The provincial flower is the Golden Shower Tree (Cassia fistula), and the provincial tree is Millettia atropurpurea.

The provincial slogan is เมืองประวัติศาสตร์ พระธาตุทองคำ ชื่นฉ่ำธรรมชาติ แร่ธาตุอุดม เครื่องถมสามกษัตริย์ มากวัดมากศิลป์ ครบสิ้นกุ้งปู, which translates to "A historical town, the golden Phra That, plentiful minerals, three-metal nielloware, numerous temples, abundant shellfish."

Administrative divisions

Provincial government
Nakhon Si Thammarat is divided into 23 districts (amphoes). The districts are further divided into 165 subdistricts (tambons) and 1428 villages (mubans).

Local government
As of 26 November 2019, there are: one Nakhon Si Thammarat Provincial Administration Organisation and 54 municipal (thesaban) areas in the province. Nakhon Si Thammarat has (thesaban nakhon) status. Pak Phun, Thung Son and Pak Panang have town (thesaban mueang) status. Further 50 subdistrict municipalities (thesaban tambon). The non-municipal areas are administered by 130 Subdistrict Administrative Organisations - SAO (ongkan borihan suan tambon).

Transport
Nakhon Si Thammarat is served by Nakhon Si Thammarat Airport and the Nakhon Si Thammarat Railway Station.

Health 
Maharaj Nakhon Si Thammarat Hospital is the main hospital of the province, operated by the Ministry of Public Health.

Education

Universities

Public universities
 Walailak University
 Nakhon Si Thammarat Rajabhat University
 Rajamangala University of Technology Srivijaya
 College of Industrial Technology and Management
 Nakhon Si Thammarat Saiyai Campus
 Nakhon Si Thammarat Thungyai Campus
 Thaksin University
 Management for Development College, Nakhon Si Thammarat Education Center
 Mahachulalongkornrajavidyalaya University, Nakhon Si Thammarat Campus
 Mahamakut Buddhist University, Sithammasokkarat Campus
 Ramkhamhaeng University, Nakhon Si Thammarat Regional Campus in Honour of His Majesty the King
 Sukhothai Thammathirat Open University, Nakhon Si Thammarat Regional Distance Education Center
 Boromarajonani College of Nursing Nakhon Si Thammarat

Vocational colleges

Public vocational colleges
 Nakhon Si Thammarat Technical College
 Thung Song Technical College
 Sichon Technical College
 Nakhon Si Thammarat Seaboard Industrial College
 Nakhon Si Thammarat Polytechnic College
 Nakhon Si Thammarat Vocational College
 Nakhon Si Thammarat Arts and Crafts College
 Nakhon Si Thammarat College of Agriculture and Technology
 Nakhon Si Thammarat Industrial and Community Education College
 Hua Sai Industrial and Community Education College
 Phrom Khiri Industrial and Community Education College
 Nakhon Si Thammarat Colleges of Dramatic Arts
 Nakhon Si Thammarat College of Fine Arts

Private vocational colleges
 Innovation Technological College
 Jaruspichakorn College of Technology
 Satapat Nakhon Technological College
 Thurakit Bundit Technological College
 Nakhon Commercial Vocational College
 Prateesasana Business Administration College
 Thaksin Vocational Technological College
 Pakphanang Vocational College
 Southern Technological College
 Thungsong Commercial College
 Charoenmit Commercial Technological College
 Sichon Commercial Technological College
 Virasinpin Vocational College
 Sakdisilpin Commercial School

Human achievement index 2017

Nakhon Si Thammarat scored 55 ("somewhat low") on the United Nations Development Programme (UNDP) Human achievement index (HAI).

Sports

Football

Volleyball clubs

See also
Nakhon Si Thammarat Kingdom

References

External links

Website of province (Thai)
Nakhon Si Thammarat provincial map, coat of arms and postal stamp
Everything in Nakhon Si Thammarat
Tambralinga

 
Provinces of Thailand
Southern Thailand
Gulf of Thailand